The first Dolphin was a cutter in the Continental Navy. 

Dolphin was purchased in February 1777 at Dover, England, and outfitted for use in the Continental Navy at Nantes, France.

During a cruise off Ireland this squadron captured and sent into port eight prizes, sank seven, and released three, throwing British shipping circles into an uproar. A 74-gun British warship gave chase to the squadron and Reprisal drew him off to enable the other ships to reach port safely. Dolphin arrived at Saint-Malo, France, 27 June 1777 where she was repaired and converted into a packet ship. On 19 September she put into the Loire for further repairs. 

Owing to diplomatic protests by the British that American vessels should not be allowed to use neutral ports to prey upon British shipping, Dolphin was seized by the British.

References
 

Cutters of the Continental Navy
Ships of the Continental Navy